Jonathan Bratoëff (born 1974 in France) is a Berlin-based guitarist.

Bratoëff is a member and co-founder of the F-IRE Collective. He has released several albums on the F-IRE Collective's own label, and has also played with musicians like Julian Siegel, Soweto Kinch, and Orphy Robinson.

Discography (in selection) 

 Episodes, 2001
 Between Lines, 2005
 Points of Perception, 2006
 Chapters (with Chris Vatalaro), 2009
 Mindscapes, 2010

Reviews 
"Bratoëff's brittle phrasing and rhythmic energy put him up there with leading UK guitarists".
"Bratoëff's voice is touched by an enigmatic, introspective quality and stands out on a set of sombre, serpentine elegance." Kevin Le Gendre – Jazzwise.

References

External links 

 

1974 births
Living people
English jazz guitarists
English male guitarists
French jazz guitarists
French male guitarists
21st-century British guitarists
21st-century British male musicians
British male jazz musicians